The 1919–20 Vanderbilt Commodores men's basketball team represented Vanderbilt University in college basketball during the 1919–20 NCAA men's basketball season.

Roster

Schedule and results

References

Vanderbilt Commodores men's basketball seasons
Vanderbilt Commodores men's basketball
Vanderbilt Commodores men's basketball
Vanderbilt